"On a Day Like Today" is a song by Canadian musician Bryan Adams, released on September 22, 1998, as the first single from his eight album, On a Day Like Today (1998). The song reached number one in Canada and number nine in Hungary. In the United Kingdom, it peaked at number thirteen on the UK Singles Chart.

Critical reception
Larry Flick of Billboard wrote, "This is the single that Adams supporters at top 40 radio have been waiting for. It shows him deftly straddling the line between the arena rock persona his diehard disciples adore and the softer, more ballad-driven crooner that made tunes like "(Everything I Do) I Do It for You" recurrent faves. On the title cut of his forthcoming album, Adams and collaborator Phil Thornalley have meticulously crafted a fine song that gradually builds from an introverted acoustic opening into a full-bodied rock power ballad. The element that makes this track work so well is an oh-so-subtle injection of psychedelic pop harmonies and quasi-symphonic strings. In the end, this is a refreshing release that bodes extremely well for the enduring artist's future at pop radio."

Track listings

Charts

Weekly charts

Year-end charts

Release history

References

1990s ballads
1998 songs
1998 singles
A&M Records singles
Bryan Adams songs
Mercury Records singles
Rock ballads
RPM Top Singles number-one singles
Songs written by Bryan Adams
Songs written by Phil Thornalley